The term The complete farmer is a book title, and can refer to:

 The Complete Practical Farmer by R.H. Budd (1835) credited for introducing the mowing of wheat in England. 
 The Compleat Farmer: Or, the Whole Art of Husbandry. by Robert Brown of Hill Farm, Somersetshire. London, 1759. 
 The Complete Farmer: Or, a General Dictionary of Husbandry, English-language encyclopaedia on agriculture first published in 1768.
 The complete farmer and rural economist, American compendium on agriculture by Thomas G. Fessenden first edition in 1834.